Senator Bell may refer to:

Members of the United States Senate
James Bell (New Hampshire politician) (1804–1857), U.S. Senator from New Hampshire from 1855 to 1857
John Bell (Tennessee politician) (1796–1869), U.S. Senator from Tennessee from 1847 to 1859
Samuel Bell (1770–1850), U.S. Senator for New Hampshire from 1823 to 1835

United States state senate members
Charles H. Bell (politician) (1823–1893), New Hampshire State Senate
Charles J. Bell (politician) (1845–1909), Vermont State Senate
Charles W. Bell (1857–1927), California State Senate
Clarence D. Bell (1914–2002), Pennsylvania State Senate
Colin Bell (American politician) (born 1981), New Jersey State Senate
Greg Bell (politician) (born 1948), Utah State Senate
Hiram Parks Bell (1827–1907), Georgia State Senate
J. Spencer Bell (1906–1967), North Carolina State Senate
James A. Bell (New York politician) (1814–?), New York State Senate
John J. Bell (1910–1963), Texas State Senate
John Bell (Florida politician) (1916–1982), Florida State Senate
Joseph M. Bell (died 1851), Massachusetts lawyer, Massachusetts State Senate
Mike Bell (politician) (born 1963), Tennessee State Senate
Robert C. Bell (1880–1964), Minnesota State Senate
Sam Bell (politician) (fl. 2010s–2020s), Rhode Island State Senate

See also
Senator Beall (disambiguation)